The Park Avenue station was a station on the BMT Jamaica Line located at the intersection of Park Avenue and Broadway in Brooklyn, New York City.

This station opened on June 25, 1888. It closed on June 5, 1916 due to its proximity to stations at Flushing Avenue and Myrtle Avenue, and to allow for the Dual Contracts rebuilding of the Jamaica Line. As part of the rebuilding, the line was given a third track, the remaining stations were given side platforms, a connection to the Myrtle Avenue Elevated was installed and the elevated was strengthened to allow subway cars to use the line.

This elevated station had two tracks and an island platform.

References

External links
 Station Reporter—Broadway El

Defunct BMT Jamaica Line stations
1888 establishments in New York (state)
Railway stations in the United States opened in 1888
Former elevated and subway stations in Brooklyn